Mount Heiser is a mountain just north of Dorrer Glacier in the Queen Elizabeth Range of Antarctica. It was mapped by the United States Geological Survey from tellurometer surveys and Navy air photos, 1960–62, and was named by the Advisory Committee on Antarctic Names for Paul W. Heiser, Jr., a United States Antarctic Research Program aurora scientist at Scott Base in 1959.

References

Mountains of the Ross Dependency
Shackleton Coast